Transcription initiation factor TFIID subunit 11  also known as TAFII28, is a protein that in humans is encoded by the TAF11 gene.

Function 

Initiation of transcription by RNA polymerase II requires the activities of more than 70 polypeptides. The protein that coordinates these activities is transcription factor IID (TFIID), which binds to the core promoter to position the polymerase properly, serves as the scaffold for assembly of the remainder of the transcription complex, and acts as a channel for regulatory signals. TFIID is composed of the TATA-binding protein (TBP) and a group of evolutionarily conserved proteins known as TBP-associated factors or TAFs. TAFs may participate in basal transcription, serve as coactivators, function in promoter recognition or modify general transcription factors (GTFs) to facilitate complex assembly and transcription initiation. This gene encodes a small subunit of TFIID that is present in all TFIID complexes and interacts with TBP. This subunit also interacts with another small subunit, TAF13, to form a heterodimer with a structure similar to the histone core structure.

In molecular biology, TAFII28 refers to the TATA box binding protein associated factor. Together with the TATA-binding protein and other TAFs it forms the general transcription factor, TFIID. They together participate in the assembly of the transcription preinitiation complex. The conserved region is found at the C terminus of most member proteins.

Structure 

The crystal structure of hTAFII28 with hTAFII18 shows that this region is involved in the binding of these two subunits. The conserved region contains four alpha helices and three loops arranged as in histone H3.

Interactions 

TAF11 has been shown to interact with:

 GTF2F1, 
 POLR2A and 
 TAF13,
 TAF15, 
 TATA binding protein,  and
 Transcription Factor II B.

References

Further reading